The Beautiful Master (German: Die schöne Meisterin) is a 1956 West German comedy film directed by Rudolf Schündler and starring Herta Staal, Paul Bösiger and Walter Gross.

The film's sets were designed by the art directors Emil Hasler and Walter Kutz. It was shot at the Spandau Studios in Berlin and on location around the Chiemsee in Bavaria.

Cast
 Herta Staal as Kathrin 
 Paul Bösiger as Peter 
 Walter Gross as Rabe 
 Susi Nicoletti  as Lisa 
 Rudolf Platte as Fritz 
 Paul Löwinger  as Leibl 
 Peter W. Staub as Franzl 
 Gretl Theimer as Anna 
 Helga Martin as Vroni 
 Wolfgang Wahl as Rhomberg 
 Oskar Paulig as Doctor Wachtel 
 Joe Furtner as Landrat

References

Bibliography 
 Willi Höfig. Der deutsche Heimatfilm 1947–1960. F. Enke, 1973.

External links 
 

1956 films
1956 comedy films
German comedy films
West German films
1950s German-language films
Films directed by Rudolf Schündler
Films shot in Bavaria
Films shot at Spandau Studios
1950s German films